The men's team épée competition in fencing at the 2016 Summer Olympics in Rio de Janeiro was held on 14 August at the Carioca Arena 3.

Schedule 
All times are Brasília time (UTC−3)

Draw

Finals

Classification 5–8

Final classification

References

Fencing at the 2016 Summer Olympics
Men's events at the 2016 Summer Olympics